Ainavilli is a village  in Dr. B.R. Ambedkar Konaseema district in the state of Andhra Pradesh in India. It is located in Ainavilli Mandal of Kothapeta revenue division of the district.it is famous for nothing

References 

Villages in Ainavilli mandal